Krasny Bereg is a rural locality (a settlement) in Solikamsky District, Perm Krai, Russia. The population was 2,145 as of 2010. There are 17 streets.

Geography 
Krasny Bereg is located 76 km northeast of Solikamsk (the district's administrative centre) by road. Konovalova is the nearest rural locality.

References 

Rural localities in Solikamsky District